Galatasaray SK is a sports club based in Istanbul, Turkey that competes in Süper Lig, the most senior football league in Turkey. Since its founding in 1905, the club has had 37 different presidents. The club is owned by the club-members of Galatasay SK, and similarly to a limited liability company, they elect the president by a ballot. The president has the responsibility for the overall management of the club, including formally signing contracts with players and staff. In Turkey, it is customary for the president to watch the games in which the first-team participates, together with the president from the opposing team.

Since its foundation, Galatasaray SK has been owned and operated only by its members (all Turkish), unlike most European football clubs. Ali Sami Yen remains the longest-running president of The Lions (14 years, from 1905 to 1919).

List of presidents
Below is the official presidential history of Galatasaray SK, from when Ali Sami Yen took over at the club in 1905, until the present day.

References
The Presidents